Austrolestes psyche is an Australian species of damselfly in the family Lestidae,
commonly known as a cup ringtail. 
It is found in south-eastern Australia where it inhabits pools, lakes and swamps.

Austrolestes psyche is a medium-sized to large damselfly, the male is light blue and black.

Gallery

See also
 List of Odonata species of Australia

References 

Lestidae
Odonata of Australia
Insects of Australia
Endemic fauna of Australia
Taxa named by Hermann August Hagen
Insects described in 1862
Damselflies